Isla Gibraleón is a small, uninhabited Panamanian island that is part of the Pearl Islands archipelago in the Gulf of Panama.

Climate
The Intertropical Convergence Zone (ITCZ), known by sailors as the doldrums, governs the climate of Isla Gibraleón. Due to its proximity to the equator, Isla Gibraleón does not have distinct seasons. Variations in the location of the ITCZ drastically affect rainfall in many equatorial regions, resulting in the wet-and-dry seasons of the tropics rather than the cold-and-warm seasons of higher latitudes. Isla Gibraleón's wet season occurs from May to December, when the ITCZ is over (or slightly north of) Panama. This period is characterised by light, variable winds and heavy rainfall. The dry season, characterised by clear skies and predominantly northeastern Caribbean trade winds, is from January to April (when the ITCZ is south of Panama). The island's location in the Pearl Islands archipelago protects it from the effects of El Niño and allows the surrounding waters—usually between  during the wet season—to sustain the uninterrupted evolution of new marine species, including whale and tiger sharks, sperm whales, sea turtles, angel rays and large schools of fish.

In popular culture
Isla Gibraleon was used for the Morgan Tribe on the television show Survivor: Pearl Islands in 2003.
Isla Gibraleón was the men's island in the first series of The Island with Bear Grylls, and the women's island in the second series. In the first series (which began on 5 May 2014), thirteen British men were taken to the island by Bear Grylls for a month; they were left alone, with the clothes they wore and some basic tools, to film themselves. For the second series (in April 2015) the format was repeated, with a team of 14 British men living on another island in the archipelago—Isla San Telmo—and Isla Gibraleón home to 14 British women.

In 2021 the swedish version of the television series The Island Sverige was filmed on the island. 8 famous swedish men and women was stranded there for 14 days.

See also

 Desert island
 List of islands

References 

Pacific islands of Panama
Gulf of Panama
Uninhabited islands of Panama
Uninhabited islands of the Pacific Ocean
Panamá Province